Old-time music is a genre of North American folk music. It developed along with various North American folk dances, such as square dancing, clogging, and buck dancing. It is played on acoustic instruments, generally centering on a combination of fiddle and plucked string instruments, most often the banjo, guitar, and mandolin. The genre is considered a precursor to modern country music.

History
Reflecting the cultures that settled North America, the roots of old-time music are in the traditional musics of the British Isles and Europe. African influences are notably found in instruments such as the banjo. In some regions French and German sources are also prominent. While many dance tunes and ballads can be traced to European sources, many others are of North American origin.

The term "old-time"
Old-time music represents perhaps the oldest form of North American traditional music other than Native American music, and thus the term "old-time" is an appropriate one.

Fiddlin' John Carson made some of the first commercial recordings of traditional American country music for the Okeh label in 1923. The recordings became hits. Okeh, which had previously coined the terms "hillbilly music" to describe Appalachian and Southern fiddle-based and religious music and "race recording" to describe the music of African American recording artists, began using "old-time music" as a term to describe the music made by artists of Carson's style. The term thus originated as a euphemism, but proved a suitable replacement for other terms that were considered disparaging by many inhabitants of these regions. It remains the term preferred by performers and listeners of the music. It is sometimes referred to as "old-timey" or "mountain music" by long-time practitioners.

Other sources
During the late 19th and early 20th centuries, tunes originating in minstrel, Tin Pan Alley, gospel, and other music styles were adapted into the old-time style. People played similar music in all regions of the United States in the 18th and 19th centuries, but in the 20th century it became associated primarily with the Appalachian region.

Revival
Important revivalists include Mike Seeger and Pete Seeger, who brought the music to New York City as early as the 1940s. The New Lost City Ramblers in particular took the revival across the country and often featured older musicians in their show. The band was originally Mike Seeger, John Cohen, and Tom Paley. When Tom left the band, he was replaced by Tracy Schwarz. New Lost City Ramblers sparked new interest in old-timey music.

Instrumentation
Old-time music is played using a wide variety of stringed instruments. The instrumentation of an old-time group is often determined by what instruments are available, as well as by tradition. The most common instruments are acoustic string instruments. Historically, the fiddle was nearly always the leading melodic instrument, and in many instances (if no other instruments were available) dances were accompanied only by a single fiddler, who often also acted as dance caller.

By the early 19th century, the banjo had become an essential partner to the fiddle, particularly in the southern United States. The banjo, originally a fretless instrument made from a gourd, provided rhythmic accompaniment to song, dance and the fiddle, incorporating a high drone provided by the instrument's short "drone string." The banjo used in old-time music is typically a 5-string model with an open back (i.e., without the resonator found on most bluegrass banjos).
Today old-time banjo players most commonly utilize the clawhammer style, but there were numerous styles, most of which are still used to some extent today. The major styles are down-picking (generally referred to today as "clawhammer," though historically myriad names were used to describe it), two-finger index lead, two-finger thumb lead, and a three-finger "fiddle style" that seems to have been influenced in part by late-19th century urban classical style. Young players might learn whatever style a parent or older sibling favored, or take inspiration from phonograph records, radio, traveling performers and migrant workers, local guitarists and banjo players, as well as other musicians they met when traveling to neighboring areas. Having a fiddle play the lead melody with a banjo playing rhythmic accompaniment is the most common form of Appalachian old-time music today.

Individualistic three-finger styles were developed independently by such important figures as Uncle Dave Macon, Dock Boggs, and Snuffy Jenkins. Those early three-finger styles, especially the technique developed by Jenkins, led to the three-finger Scruggs style created by Earl Scruggs in the 1940s, which helped advance the split between the old-time genre and the solo-centric style that became known as bluegrass. Jenkins developed a three-finger "roll" method that, while obviously part of the old-time tradition, inspired Scruggs to develop the smoother, faster and more complex rolls that are now standard fare in bluegrass music.

In the 19th and early 20th centuries, musicians began to add other stringed instruments to the fiddle-banjo duo—including guitar, mandolin, and double bass (or washtub bass). These provided chordal, bass line, and pitched rhythmic accompaniment, and occasionally took over the melody, usually during a "break" section that lasted the duration of a verse, refrain, or verse and refrain.  This, along with a Dobro (resonator guitar), is also considered 'standard' bluegrass instrumentation, but old-time music tends to focus on sparser instrumentation and arrangements compared to bluegrass. Such an assemblage, of whatever instrumentation, became known simply as a "string band."  Less frequently used are the cello, piano, hammered dulcimer, Appalachian dulcimer, tenor banjo, tenor guitar, lap-steel guitar, mandola, mouth bow, as well as other instruments such as the jug, harmonica, autoharp, jaw harp, concertina, button or accordion, washboard, spoons, or bones.

The fiddle is sometimes played by two people at the same time, with one player using the bow and fingers, while another player stands to the side and taps out a rhythm on the fiddle strings using small sticks called fiddlesticks (also spelled "fiddle sticks"). This technique (also sometimes called "beating the straws") is utilized in performance most notably by the duo of Al and Emily Cantrell.

Each regional old-time tradition accompanies different dance styles. Some of these include clogging and flatfoot dancing (Appalachia), contra dancing (New England), square dancing (Southern states) and step dancing (Nova Scotia, particularly Cape Breton Island), though there is some overlap between regions.

Regional styles
There are numerous regional styles of old-time music, each with its own repertoire and playing style. Nevertheless, some tunes (such as "Soldier's Joy") are found in nearly every regional style, though played somewhat differently in each.

Appalachia

Appalachian folk music is brought to the United States by immigrants and slaves. In turn it influenced country music and old-time music.

As a result of the terrain of the region, the societies and cultures were fairly isolated from outside intervention. In 1916, Cecil Sharp arrived in Appalachia and began recording the folk songs on the Mountains. Sharp, an authority on British ballads, was able to identify 1,600 versions of 500 songs from 281 singers, almost all having their origins in the English/Scottish Child Ballads. After his first study in Appalachia, he published English Folk Songs from the Southern Appalachians. Some examples of songs preserved in the Appalachian Mountains and recorded by Sharp include, "The Hangman Song", "Barbara Allen", etc. The primary sources for many of Sharp's recordings came from a string of related families around Shelton Laurel, NC. Of note is the fact that these families maintained a specific, unique vocal tradition and traditional English lyrical pronunciations across several generations, until gaining fame in the 1960s and 1970s through similar field recordings completed by John Cohen. These records featured Dillard Chandler, Berzilla Wallin (recorded by Sharp) and Dellie Norton. Relatives of those individuals continue to keep this unique vocal style alive to this day.

A Scottish fiddler named Niel Gow (note the unorthodox spelling) is usually credited with developing (during the 1740s) the short bow sawstroke technique that defines Appalachian fiddling. This technique was altered during the next century, with European waltzes and polkas being most influential.

African Americans, who were not only slaves but also free blacks working in timber, coal mining, and other industries, influenced Appalachian music as the banjo was adopted from African Americans by white musicians (such as Joel Walker Sweeney) in the years leading up to the Civil War.

Appalachian folk became a major influence on styles like country music and bluegrass. It is one of the few regional styles of old-time music that, since World War II, has been learned and widely practiced in all areas of the United States and Canada (as well as in Europe, Australia, and elsewhere). In some cases (as in the Midwest and Northeast), its popularity has eclipsed the indigenous old-time traditions of these regions. There is a particularly high concentration of performers playing Appalachian folk music on the East and West Coasts (especially in New York City, Los Angeles, San Francisco, and the Pacific Northwest). A number of American classical composers, in particular Henry Cowell and Aaron Copland, have composed works that merge the idioms of Appalachian folk music with the Old World–based classical tradition.

Appalachian old-time music is itself made up of regional traditions. Some of the most prominent traditions include those of North Georgia (The Skillet Lickers) Mount Airy, North Carolina (specifically the Round Peak style of Tommy Jarrell) and Grayson County/Galax, Virginia (Wade Ward and Albert Hash), West Virginia (the Hammons Family), Eastern Kentucky (J. P. Fraley and Lee Sexton), Middle Tennessee (Uncle Dave Macon, The McGee Brothers, Thomas Maupin, and Fiddlin' Arthur Smith), and East Tennessee (Charlie Acuff, The Roan Mountain Hilltoppers, G.B. Grayson).

The banjo player and fiddler Bascom Lamar Lunsford, a native of the North Carolina mountains, collected much traditional music during his lifetime, also founding the old-time music festival in Asheville, North Carolina. Notable North Carolina traditional banjo players and makers include Frank Proffitt, Frank Proffitt Jr. and Stanley Hicks, who all learned to make and play fretless mountain banjos from a family tradition. These players, among others, learned their art primarily from family and show fewer traces of influence from commercial hillbilly recordings. The Proffitts and Hicks were heirs to a centuries-old folk tradition, and through the middle to late 20th century they performed in a style older than the stringbands often associated with old time music. Their style has been recently emulated by contemporary musician Tim Eriksen.

The Southern states (particularly coastal states such as Virginia and North Carolina) also have one of the oldest traditions of old-time music in the United States.

States of the Deep South such as Alabama, Mississippi, Georgia, and Louisiana also have their own regional old-time music traditions and repertoires, as does the Ozark Mountains region of Arkansas and Missouri. Premier old time banjoist Bob Carlin has authored String Bands in the North Carolina Piedmont with a focus on non-Appalachian styles in that state. While the music of the Louisiana Cajuns has much in common with other North American old-time traditions it is generally treated as a tradition unto itself and not referred to as a form of old-time music.

Native American old-time music
Several distinctive Native American and First Nations old-time traditions exist, including Métis fiddle and Athabaskan fiddle.

Old-time music has also been adopted by individual Native American musicians including Walker Calhoun (1918-2012) of Big Cove, in the Qualla Boundary (home to the Eastern Band of Cherokee Indians, just outside the Great Smoky Mountains National Park in western North Carolina). Calhoun played three-finger-style banjo and sang in the Cherokee language.

New England
The New England states, being among the first settled by Europeans, have one of the oldest traditions of old-time music. Although the Puritans (the first Europeans to settle in the region), frowned upon instrumental music, dance music flourished in both urban and rural areas beginning in the 17th century. Primary instruments today include the fiddle, piano, and guitar, with the wooden flute sometimes also used. As with Appalachian folk, a number of classical composers have turned to New England folk music for melodic and harmonic ideas, most famously Charles Ives, as well as Aaron Copland, William Schuman, and John Cage, among others. Rhythmically, this style is more diverse than most southern old time, featuring schottisches, hornpipes, and waltzes in addition to reels.

Midwest
Beginning in the early 19th century, when the Midwestern states were first settled by immigrants from the eastern United States and Europe, the Midwest developed its own regional styles of old-time music. Among these, the Missouri style is of particular interest for its energetic bowing style, while Michigan is one of the few areas in North America with a continuous hammered dulcimer tradition through the twentieth century.

The region of central and southern Illinois has its own distinct style and repertoire of old-time music as well.

In the Upper Midwest, especially Minnesota, old-time music most typically refers to a mixture of Scandinavian styles, especially Norwegian and Swedish.

Texas and the West
Texas developed a distinctive twin-fiddling tradition that was later popularized by Bob Wills as Western swing music. Fiddle music has also been popular since the 19th century in other Western states such as Oklahoma and Colorado. The National Oldtime Fiddlers' Contest has been held each year in Weiser, Idaho since 1953.

Oklahoma, with its high concentration of Native American inhabitants, has produced some Native American old-time string bands, most notably Big Chief Henry's Indian String Band (consisting of Henry Hall, fiddle; Clarence Hall, guitar; and Harold Hall, banjo and voice), which was recorded by H. C. Speir for the Victor company in 1929.

The Pacific Northwest has a vibrant old-time music community. Extending the north–south corridor from Seattle to Portland and west to Weiser, ID and Boise, gatherings and festivals such as the Portland Old Time Gathering, Festival of American Fiddle Tunes in Port Townsend, WA, an annual campout in Centralia, WA and the National Oldtime Fiddlers' Contest have helped build a growing and multi-generational old time music community.

Canada
Among the prominent styles of old-time music in Canada are the Scottish-derived tradition of Nova Scotia (particularly Cape Breton Island), the French Canadian music of Quebec and Acadia, the old-time music of Ontario, and the prairie fiddling traditions of the central-western provinces. It is here (primarily in Manitoba and Saskatchewan) that the fiddle tradition of the Métis people is found. The traditional folk music of Newfoundland and Labrador, though similar in some ways to that of the rest of Atlantic Canada, has a distinct style of its own. As such, it is generally considered as its own genre.

Contemporary musicians
The current old-time music scene is alive and well, sparked since the mid-1990s by the combined exposure resulting from several prominent films, more accessible depositories of source material, and the work of a few of touring bands, including The Freight Hoppers, The Wilders, Uncle Earl, Old Crow Medicine Show, and the Glade City Rounders.

A new generation of old-time musicians performs as solo acts and band leaders all over the country, including: Brad Leftwich, Bruce Molsky, Rafe Stefanini, Bruce Greene, Rhys Jones, Rayna Gellert, Riley Baugus, Leroy Troy, Alice Gerrard, Dirk Powell, Walt Koken, Clifton Hicks, and Martha Scanlan. The Appalachian dulcimer has long been a part of string bands in the Galax, VA, area and is seeing new popularity re-emerging as a key instrument for old-time music, thanks to the influence of musicians such as Don Pedi, David Schnaufer, Lois Hornbostel, Wayne Seymour his disciples, Milltown and Stephen Seifert. American hammered dulcimer players like Ken Kolodner, Mark Alan Wade and Rick Thum continue this tradition.  Family bands, such as The Martin Family Band, from Maryland, are continuing the traditions of old time music played on fiddle, banjo, lap dulcimer, hammered dulcimer, mandolin, piano, guitar, bass and percussion. The Carolina Chocolate Drops directly address the lost tradition of black stringband music.

Living elders of the music include Charlie Acuff of Alcoa, Tennessee, Chester McMillian of Mount Airy, North Carolina, Lee Sexton of Line Fork, Kentucky, Thomas Maupin of Murfreesboro, Tennessee, George Gibson of Knott Co., Kentucky, Michael Defosche Jackson Co., TN, Rob Morrison of Chapel Hill, North Carolina, Jimmy Costa of Talcott, West Virginia, Curtis Hicks of Chattanooga, Tennessee, Clyde Davenport of Monticello, Kentucky, Delmer Holland of Waverly, Tennessee, and Harold Luce of Chelsea, Vermont.

Festivals

Prominent old-time music festivals (some of which also include bluegrass, dance, and other related arts) include the Northern Lights Bluegrass and Old Tyme Music Camp and Festival in Saskatoon, Saskatchewan, Canada (established 2005), Old Fiddler's Convention in Galax, Virginia (established 1935), the West Virginia State Folk Festival in Glenville, West Virginia (established 1950), the National Oldtime Fiddlers' Contest in Weiser, Idaho (established 1953), the Mount Airy Fiddlers Convention in Mount Airy, North Carolina (established 1972), Uncle Dave Macon Days in Murfreesboro, Tennessee, the Vandalia Gathering in Charleston, West Virginia (established 1977), the Appalachian String Band Music Festival in Clifftop, Fayette County, West Virginia (established 1990), Breakin' Up Winter in Lebanon, Tennessee, the Winfield Music Festival is held in Winfield, Kansas and the Smithville Fiddlers' Jamboree and Crafts Festival  held in Smithville, Tennessee (established in 1972).
Gallery

Old-time music as dance music
Because old-time fiddle-based string band music is often played for dances, it is often characterized as dance music. However, there are also long-standing traditions of solo listening pieces as well as fiddle songs, such as those that have been documented in West Virginia by Erynn Marshall in Music in the Air Somewhere: The Shifting Borders of West Virginia's Fiddle and Song Traditions (WVU Press, 2006). In dance music as played by old-time string bands, emphasis is placed on providing a strong beat, and instrumental solos, or breaks, are rarely taken. This contrasts with bluegrass music, which developed in the 1940s as concert music. Bluegrass music, however, developed from old-time music, and shares many of the same songs and instruments, but is more oriented toward solo performance than is old-time music.

While in the British Isles reels and jigs both remain popular, the reel is by far the predominant metric structure preferred by old-time musicians in the United States (though a few hornpipes are also still performed). Canadian musicians, particularly in the Maritime provinces where the Scottish influence is strong, perform both reels and jigs (as well as other types of tunes such as marches and strathspeys).

Learning old-time music
Players traditionally learn old-time music by ear; even musicians who can read music. A broad selection of written music does exist, although many believe that the style of old-time music cannot be practically notated by written music. This is in part because there are many regional and local variations to old-time tunes, and because some of the most noted players often improvised and wouldn't play a tune exactly the same way every time.

Players usually learn old-time music by attending local jam sessions and by attending festivals scattered around the country. With the spread of broad-band Internet, more and more old-time recordings are available via small publishers,  Internet streaming audio ("Web radio"), and small Web sites making the music more accessible.

Although it is one of the oldest and most prominent forms of traditional music in the United States and Canada, old-time music (with a few notable exceptions) is generally not taught in North American primary schools, secondary schools, or universities. Although square dancing is still occasionally taught in elementary schools (generally with recorded, rather than live music), old-time instruments and dances are not included in the educational system, and must be studied outside the school system.

Appalachia
Located in Johnson City, Tennessee, East Tennessee State University is the only four-year university in the world with a comprehensive program in bluegrass and old time music studies. (Morehead State offers a program also.)  The program includes a variety of bluegrass and country music courses, both performance-oriented and academic. Minors in both Bluegrass and in Appalachian Studies are also offered.

There are a variety of programs, mostly in the summer, such as the Augusta Heritage Festival, the Cowan Creek Mountain Music School, or the Appalachian String Band Music Festival, that offer week-long immersions in old-time music and dance. These camps are family friendly and allow beginners to enter into the tradition and more advanced players to hone their sound with instruction from some of the best in the music.

Outside Appalachia
There are, however a growing number of folk music schools in the greater United States, usually non-profit community based, that have taken up the mantle of providing instruction in old-time music:
The Old Town School of Folk Music in Chicago, Illinois is perhaps the oldest of these, having begun in 1957.

These schools and the subsequent music communities that spring from them offer a positive trend in keeping old-time music alive. Also, universities such as Berklee College of Music, the University of North Carolina at Greensboro, Brown University, UCLA, and Florida State University have "Old Time Ensembles" to teach and keep Old Time music alive.
Regular old-time jam circles are also important to spreading and teaching this music. Regular old-time jams occur not only throughout the United States, but in places as far flung as Beijing, China, where the Beijing Pickers jam spawned a bluegrass/Americana group the Randy Abel Stable and the old-time band the Hutong Yellow Weasels.
In the UK Friends of American Old Time Music and Dance was formed in 1995. A year later Sore Fingers Summer School was started.

Films
Appalachian Journey (1990). Original material recorded and directed by Alan Lomax. A Dibbs Directions Production for Channel Four TV in association with Alan Lomax. Presented by North Carolina Public TV. 1991 videocassette release of an episode from the 1990 television series American Patchwork: Songs and Stories of America.
 My Old Fiddle:  A Visit with Tommy Jarrell in the Blue Ridge (1994). Directed by Les Blank. El Cerrito, California:  Flower Films. .
 New England Fiddles (1995). Produced and directed by John M. Bishop. A Media Generation production. Montpelier, Vermont:  Distributed by Multicultural Media.
Songcatcher (dir. Maggie Greenwald, 2000) is a film about a musicologist researching Appalachian folk music in western North Carolina.
 Sprout Wings and Fly (1983). Produced and directed by Les Blank, CeCe Conway, and Alice Gerrard. El Cerrito, California:  Flower Films. 
O Brother, Where Art Thou? (2000). Produced by Ethan Coen, Working Title Films, Studio Canal. Directed by Joel Coen.
Cold Mountain (2003), Anthony Minghella (Dir.) Miramax, Mirage Enterprises, Bona Fide Productions.
The Mountain Minor (2019). Directed by Dale Farmer. Produced by Susan Pepper. Alt452 Productions.

See also
Banjo
Bluegrass music
Folk music
Music of East Tennessee
Mary Sands
Fiddle
The Fiddler's Fakebook
Country music in Atlanta
"Old-Time Religion" (song)

References

External links

 Hillbilly Music: Source and Symbol
 Appalachian Traditional Music: A Short History
 Old Time Music Source list
 Sheet music, lyrics & midis for 200+ traditional old-time songs
 Honkingduck.com, Listen to 700+ 78rpm recordings of old time music and search a discography of 319,000+ more.

 
American folk music
Appalachian culture
Country music genres
Culture of the Southern United States
Square dance